The Volkssport (German Verband Volkssport, Nazionalsozialistischer Verband für Wandern, Radfahren, Spiel und Sport aller Art) was the paramilitary wing of the German National Socialist Workers' Party (DNSAP) in Czechoslovakia between 1929 and 1932, later operating illegally.

It was founded on May 15, 1929 on the example of the Sturmabteilung by Hans Krebs and  under the guise of a sporting organization.

It was banned on 22 February 1932 by Czechoslovak authorities.

Gallery

References

External links

Military wings of fascist parties
Nazism
Paramilitary organizations based in Czechoslovakia
Organizations disestablished in 1932
Sudetenland
Military units and formations established in 1929